William Law (1686–1761) was an English divine and theological writer.

William Law may also refer to:

William Law (Lord Provost) (1799-1878) Lord Provost of Edinburgh
William Law (Latter Day Saints) (1809–1892), Irish-born American leader and apostate in the Latter Day Saint movement
William Law (cricketer) (1851–1892), English amateur cricketer
William D. Law, President of Tallahassee Community College, Florida
William Henry Law (1803–1881), Connecticut state legislator
William Law (Canadian politician) (1833–1901), merchant and political figure in Nova Scotia, Canada
William John Law (1786–1869), British judge
William A. Law, former director of Chatham and Phenix National Bank
Bill Law, English drummer, formerly of My Dying Bride
William A. H. "Bill" Law (1913-2004), Ottawa controller and alderman 
 Arthur Law (playwright) (William Arthur Law, 1844–1913), English playwright